Arthroleptis taeniatus is a species of frog in the family Arthroleptidae. It is found in southern Cameroon, south-western Central African Republic, Equatorial Guinea (including Bioko), Gabon, western Democratic Republic of the Congo, and probably the Republic of the Congo.
Its natural habitats are shallow marshes in forest. It can be locally threatened by habitat loss. It is common in parts of its range (i.e., Cameroon).

References

taeniatus
Frogs of Africa
Amphibians of Cameroon
Amphibians of the Democratic Republic of the Congo
Amphibians of Equatorial Guinea
Amphibians of Gabon
Amphibians of the Republic of the Congo
Taxa named by George Albert Boulenger
Amphibians described in 1906
Taxonomy articles created by Polbot